Ohod Medina (a.k.a. Ohud Medina or Uhud Medina) is a professional basketball club based in the city of Medina in the Al Madinah Province, Saudi Arabia that plays in the Saudi Premier League. Ohud is the most successful team in the Premier League, having won the league title 18 times.

Achievements
Saudi Premier League champion: 1979, 1980, 1981, 1982, 1983, 1984, 1985, 1986, 1987, 1988, 1989, 1991, 1995, 2002, 2003, 2012, 2015, 2018, 2019, 2020
Alnokhbah Championship winner: 1998, 2003, 2010
Saudi Arabia Prince Faisal bin Fahad Cup winner: 2014

Current squad

Notable players
To appear in this section a player must have either:
- Set a club record or won an individual award as a professional player.
- Played at least one official international match for his senior national team or one NBA game at any time.
 Nassir Abojalas
 Fahad Belal Al-Salik
 Djibril Thiam

References

External links
Team profile at Asia-Basket.com
Presentation at Facebook

Videos
2015 SBL Championship video at youtube.com

Basketball teams established in 1939
Basketball teams in Saudi Arabia
Sport in Medina